Portrait in Jazz is an album by American jazz pianist Bill Evans, released in 1960. It is the first of only two studio albums to be recorded with his famous trio featuring bassist Scott LaFaro and drummer Paul Motian.

History
Eight months after his successful collaboration with Miles Davis on the album Kind of Blue, Evans recorded Portrait in Jazz with a new group (the Bill Evans Trio) that helped change the direction of modern jazz.

Most noticeably, LaFaro's bass is promoted from a mere accompanying instrument to one of almost equal status to the piano (though not to the extent that it would be on later albums such as Sunday at the Village Vanguard).  It is one of Evans' more up-tempo and swinging albums (the presence of several ballads notwithstanding).

Reception

Reviewing it for Allmusic, music critic Scott Yanow wrote of the album: "... the influential interpretations were far from routine or predictable at the time. LaFaro and Motian were nearly equal partners with the pianist in the ensembles... A gem." Danny Eccleston of Mojo wrote: "Portrait In Jazz - Evans' fifth record as a band leader - gets you every which way. At its least great, it is merely brilliant... But what makes Evans extra-extra-special is the way his playing drags you in and shares the vulnerability at its core. Oh, the humanity!"

Track listing
"Come Rain or Come Shine" (Harold Arlen, Johnny Mercer) – 3:24
"Autumn Leaves" (Joseph Kosma, Jacques Prévert, Johnny Mercer)  – 6:00
"Witchcraft" (Cy Coleman, Carolyn Leigh) – 4:37
"When I Fall in Love" (Victor Young, Edward Heyman) – 4:57
"Peri's Scope" (Bill Evans) – 3:15
"What Is This Thing Called Love?" (Cole Porter) – 4:36
"Spring Is Here" (Richard Rodgers, Lorenz Hart) – 5:09
"Someday My Prince Will Come" (Frank Churchill, Larry Morey) – 4:57
"Blue in Green" (Miles Davis, Bill Evans) – 5:25

Bonus tracks on CD reissue:
"Come Rain or Come Shine" [Take 4] - 3:23
"Autumn Leaves" [Take 9, mono] - 5:25
"Blue in Green" [Take 1] – 4:39
"Blue in Green" [Take 2] – 4:26

Personnel 
 Bill Evans – piano
 Scott LaFaro – bass
 Paul Motian – drums

Additional personnel
 Orrin Keepnews – producer
 Jack Higgins – engineer
 George Horn – mastering

References

External links
Jazz Discography entries for Bill Evans
Bill Evans Memorial Library discography

1960 albums
Bill Evans albums
Riverside Records albums
Albums produced by Orrin Keepnews